Brianna Marie Keilar (born September 21, 1980) is an Australian-born American journalist who formerly was the co-anchor of New Day with John Berman on CNN. She previously worked as a White House correspondent, senior political correspondent, Congressional correspondent and general assignment correspondent for CNN in Washington. Prior to that, Keilar worked at CNN Newsource as a national correspondent, also in Washington. Before joining New Day, she was the host of CNN Right Now with Brianna Keilar.

Early life and education
Keilar was born in Canberra, Australian Capital Territory, Australia. Her father Glenn is Australian, and her mother Miriam was American. The Keilars were stationed in Australia at the time of Brianna's birth. In 1982, Keilar and her family moved to the United States and settled in Orange County, California. Keilar graduated from Mission Viejo High School in 1998, where she was voted homecoming queen in her senior year. Keilar then attended the University of California, Berkeley, from which she graduated in 2001 with dual bachelor's degrees in mass communications and psychology.

Career

Keilar began her on-air career in Yakima, Washington, at the CBS affiliate KIMA. She also co-hosted the morning drivetime show Billy, Blue and Brianna, too: The Morning Zoo on contemporary hits station, KFFM. She then moved to CBS News, where she served as an anchor, reporter and producer for a CBS newscast that aired on MTVU, MTV's college network. She was also a fill-in anchor on the CBS News overnight newscast, Up to the Minute, and a freelance reporter for the weekend edition of CBS Evening News.

From CBS, Keilar joined CNN as a correspondent for CNN Newsource, providing breaking news coverage and reports from the nation’s capital for approximately 800 CNN Newsource partner stations. As a general assignment correspondent for the network, she covered a wide range of stories, including the 2007 Virginia Tech massacre, where she was the first CNN correspondent at the scene.

While covering Congress, Keilar earned the 2009 National Press Foundation Everett McKinley Dirksen Award for Distinguished Reporting of Congress for her fall 2008 coverage of the $700 billion bank bailout. While covering the Obama White House, Keilar earned the White House Correspondents' Association's 2014 Aldo Beckman Memorial Award for her coverage of the rollout of Obamacare. 

Keilar, a military spouse, began writing a column called Home Front in 2019, which tells stories of military families and tries to bridge the civilian-military divide.

On September 15, 2022, it was announced that Keilar would leave her role on New Day with John Berman as the show is replaced by CNN This Morning. She continued to co-anchor the show until the new CNN revamped morning show debuted on  November 1. She was assigned a new anchor role at the network anchoring a program which is currently untitled with Boris Sanchez and Jim Scuitto. The program will begin later this spring.

Personal life
Keilar married Dave French on May 2, 2009. They later divorced. In July 2016, Keilar announced that she was engaged to Fernando Lujan, an active duty Green Beret who was then a director on the National Security Council at the White House. During CNN's New Year's Eve Live on December 31, 2016, Brooke Baldwin announced that Keilar and Lujan had married the previous evening in Las Vegas. She gave birth to a boy on June 8, 2018.

References

External links
 
 CNN profile

1980 births
Living people
CNN people
People from Mission Viejo, California
University of California, Berkeley alumni
American television reporters and correspondents
American women television journalists
Journalists from California
American political journalists
Australian emigrants to the United States
Australian people of American descent
Citizens of the United States through descent
People from Canberra
Mission Viejo High School alumni